Nowa Wieś (meaning "new village") is a very common place name in Poland. It may refer to:

In Greater Poland Voivodeship (west-central Poland)

Nowa Wieś, Czarnków-Trzcianka County
Nowa Wieś, Gmina Rychtal
Nowa Wieś, Gmina Trzcinica
Nowa Wieś, Gmina Skulsk
Nowa Wieś, Koło County
Nowa Wieś, Gmina Sompolno
Nowa Wieś, Kościan County
Nowa Wieś, Krotoszyn County
Nowa Wieś, Gmina Pleszew
Nowa Wieś, Gmina Gizałki
Nowa Wieś, Gmina Słupca
Nowa Wieś, Gmina Zagórów
Nowa Wieś, Gmina Kaźmierz
Nowa Wieś, Gmina Wronki
Nowa Wieś, Wągrowiec County
Nowa Wieś, Wolsztyn County

In Kuyavian-Pomeranian Voivodeship (north-central Poland)

Nowa Wieś, Aleksandrów County
Nowa Wieś, Brodnica County
Nowa Wieś, Gmina Ciechocin
Nowa Wieś, Gmina Golub-Dobrzyń
Nowa Wieś, Grudziądz County
Nowa Wieś, Gmina Chrostkowo
Nowa Wieś, Gmina Wielgie
Nowa Wieś, Mogilno County
Nowa Wieś, Radziejów County
Nowa Wieś, Toruń County
Nowa Wieś, Gmina Izbica Kujawska
Nowa Wieś, Gmina Lubień Kujawski
Nowa Wieś, Gmina Włocławek
Nowa Wieś, Sępólno County

In Lesser Poland Voivodeship (south Poland)

Nowa Wieś, a neighbourhood in the Krowodrza district of Kraków
Nowa Wieś, Kraków County
Nowa Wieś, Myślenice County
Nowa Wieś, Nowy Sącz County
Nowa Wieś, Oświęcim County

In Łódź Voivodeship (central Poland)

Nowa Wieś, Bełchatów County
Nowa Wieś, Gmina Kutno
Nowa Wieś, Gmina Nowe Ostrowy
Nowa Wieś, Pajęczno County
Nowa Wieś, Gmina Rozprza
Nowa Wieś, Gmina Sulejów
Nowa Wieś, Gmina Poddębice
Nowa Wieś, Gmina Wartkowice
Nowa Wieś, Sieradz County
Nowa Wieś, Wieluń County

In Lower Silesian Voivodeship (south-west Poland)

Nowa Wieś, Gmina Nowogrodziec
Nowa Wieś, Gmina Bolesławiec

In Lublin Voivodeship (east Poland)

Nowa Wieś, Biłgoraj County
Nowa Wieś, Tomaszów Lubelski County
Nowa Wieś, Gmina Krasnobród
Nowa Wieś, Gmina Stary Zamość

In Lubusz Voivodeship (west Poland)

Nowa Wieś, Międzyrzecz County
Nowa Wieś, Wschowa County

In Masovian Voivodeship (east-central Poland)

Nowa Wieś, Gmina Ciechanów
Nowa Wieś, Gmina Ojrzeń
Nowa Wieś, Gostynin County
Nowa Wieś, Grójec County
Nowa Wieś, Kozienice County
Nowa Wieś, Legionowo County
Nowa Wieś, Gmina Lipsko
Nowa Wieś, Gmina Sienno
Nowa Wieś, Mińsk County
Nowa Wieś, Mława County
Nowa Wieś, Nowy Dwór Mazowiecki County
Nowa Wieś, Ostrołęka County
Nowa Wieś, Otwock County
Nowa Wieś, Piaseczno County
Nowa Wieś, Gmina Drobin
Nowa Wieś, Gmina Nowy Duninów
Nowa Wieś, Gmina Staroźreby
Nowa Wieś, Pruszków County
Nowa Wieś, Przasnysz County
Nowa Wieś, Gmina Młodzieszyn
Nowa Wieś, Gmina Rybno
Nowa Wieś, Sokołów County
Nowa Wieś, Warsaw West County
Nowa Wieś, Gmina Długosiodło
Nowa Wieś, Gmina Rząśnik
Nowa Wieś, Gmina Kuczbork-Osada
Nowa Wieś, Gmina Siemiątkowo
Nowa Wieś, Żyrardów County

In Podlaskie Voivodeship (north-east Poland)

Nowa Wieś, Łomża County
Nowa Wieś, Mońki County
Nowa Wieś, Lubartów County
Nowa Wieś, Sokółka County
Nowa Wieś, Gmina Bakałarzewo
Nowa Wieś, Gmina Suwałki

In Silesian Voivodeship (south Poland)

Nowa Wieś, Będzin County 
Nowa Wieś, Gmina Dąbrowa Zielona
Nowa Wieś, Gmina Poczesna
Nowa Wieś, Gliwice County
Nowa Wieś, Gmina Kłobuck
Nowa Wieś, Gmina Popów
Nowa Wieś, Rybnik County

In Subcarpathian Voivodeship (south-east Poland)

Nowa Wieś, Kolbuszowa County
Nowa Wieś, Krosno County
Nowa Wieś, Gmina Nisko
Nowa Wieś, Gmina Harasiuki
Nowa Wieś, Przemyśl County
Nowa Wieś, Rzeszów County
Nowa Wieś, Strzyżów County

In Świętokrzyskie Voivodeship (south-central Poland)

Nowa Wieś, Gmina Busko-Zdrój
Nowa Wieś, Gmina Stopnica
Nowa Wieś, Gmina Słupia
Nowa Wieś, Opatów County
Nowa Wieś, Sandomierz County

In Warmian-Masurian Voivodeship (north Poland)

Nowa Wieś, Działdowo County
Nowa Wieś, Elbląg County
Nowa Wieś, Iława County
Nowa Wieś, Olsztyn County
Nowa Wieś, Pisz County

In West Pomeranian Voivodeship (north-west Poland)

Nowa Wieś, West Pomeranian Voivodeship

See also